Bob Jackson was the manager of the English football club Portsmouth F.C. from 1947 to 1952. Jackson led Pompey to two top league titles in the 1948–49 and 1949–50 seasons, the only in their history. He departed in the summer of 1952 to take over at ambitious second division club Hull City, but could not replicate the success he had at Fratton Park.

Honours
Portsmouth
 Football League First Division: 1948–49, 1949–50
 FA Charity Shield: 1949 (Shared)

See also 
 List of English football championship winning managers

References

English football managers
Year of birth missing (living people)
Living people
Worcester City F.C. managers
Portsmouth F.C. managers
Hull City A.F.C. managers